The Cabinet of Alejandro Giammattei constitutes the current government and the fifty-first cabinet of Guatemala.

Giammattei's cabinet succeeded Jimmy Morales' cabinet, after the 2019 general election. The officials took office on January 14, 2020.

Composition

References

Politics of Guatemala
Government of Guatemala
Giammattei
2020 establishments in Guatemala
Cabinets established in 2020